, also romanized as Wadō-kaichin or called Wadō-kaihō, is the oldest official Japanese coinage, first mentioned for 29 August 708 on order of Empress Genmei. It was long considered to be the first type of coin produced in Japan. Analyses of several findings of Fuhon-sen (富夲銭) in Asuka have shown that those coins were manufactured from 683.

Description  
The wadōkaichin was first produced following the discovery of large copper deposits in Japan during the early 8th century.

The coins, which are round with a square hole in the center, remained in circulation until 958 CE.

This coinage was inspired by the Chinese Tang dynasty coinage (唐銭) named Kaigen Tsūhō (Chinese: 開元通宝, Kāiyuán tōngbǎo), first minted in Chang'an in 621 CE. The wadōkaichin had the same specifications as the Chinese coin, with a diameter of 2.4 cm and a weight of 3.75 g.

Etymology 
The name wadōkaichin comes from the Japanese pronunciation of the four characters in the coin's inscription:    .

 The first two characters literally mean  + .
 The third character  literally means "opening; to open", with an additional sense of "start; first".
 The fourth character  is unusual.  It is considered to be either a variant form of  meaning "rare, precious", or a ryakuji or abbreviated character for  meaning "treasure, something precious".  This difference in interpretation gives rise to the alternative name for the coins, wadōkaihō.  Based in part on further research into writing conventions during the Nara period, the broad consensus in modern research appears to be the  interpretation.
 → Together, the third and fourth characters likely mean "first currency".

Hoards of Wadōkaichin cash coins  

 In February 2015 Japanese archeologists discovered ritual jars filled with wadōkaichin and  cash coins at the Tehara ruins in Rittō, Shiga Prefecture. The jars were placed there as a part of a Buddhist ritual, which indicates that the site was likely a government office or the resident of an important local.

 On August 17, 2015 four wadōkaichin cache coins were discovered at the East Pagoda of Yakushi-ji, Nara during a restoration. The wadōkaichin were located 1.3 meters east of a foundation rock at the bottom of the 1.7 meter-deep base of the East Pagoda of the temple. Experts from the Nara National Research Institute for Cultural Properties and the Nara Prefectural Archeological Institute of Kashihara believe that the wadōkaichin were buried at the East Pagoda during the groundbreaking ceremony of the Buddhist temple and that these cache coins were used for purification purposes. According to the experts, this discovery at the Yakushi-ji is the oldest known example of the ancient Japanese practice of burying a cache of widely-circulated coins to purify a construction site anywhere in Japan.

See also 

 Ryō (Japanese coin)
 Japanese mon (currency)
 Wadō (era)
 Economy of Japan

Notes

References 
 Brown, Delmer M. and Ichirō Ishida, eds. (1979).  Gukanshō: The Future and the Past. Berkeley: University of California Press. ; OCLC 251325323
 Ponsonby-Fane, Richard. (1959). The Imperial House of Japan. Kyoto: Ponsonby Memorial Society. OCLC 194887
 Nussbaum, Louis-Frédéric and Käthe Roth. (2005).  Japan encyclopedia. Cambridge: Harvard University Press. ; OCLC 58053128
 Titsingh, Isaac. (1834).  Annales des empereurs du Japon (Nihon Odai Ichiran).  Paris: Royal Asiatic Society, Oriental Translation Fund of Great Britain and Ireland. OCLC 5850691 
 Varley, H. Paul. (1980). A Chronicle of Gods and Sovereigns: Jinnō Shōtōki of Kitabatake Chikafusa. New York: Columbia University Press.  ; OCLC 6042764

External links 
 Wado Kaichin from Japan Mint Museum

Economy of feudal Japan
Coins of Japan 
Cash coins by inscription